The Moulton-Udell Community School District is a public school district in Moulton, Iowa in the United States.

The district is mainly in eastern Appanoose County, with a smaller area in western Davis County. The district serves the towns of Moulton and Udell, and the surrounding rural areas.

The school's mascot is the Eagles. Their colors are royal and white.

Schools
The district operates two schools on a single campus at 305 E. 8th in Moulton: 
Moulton-Udell Elementary School
Moulton-Udell High School

References

External links
 Moulton-Udell Community School District

School districts in Iowa
Education in Appanoose County, Iowa
Education in Davis County, Iowa